Bron-Char is a fictional character appearing in American comic books published by Marvel Comics. Created by writer Mark Waid and artist Joe Kubert, the character debuted in Avengers Vol. 1, #364 (July 1993). He was a member of the Lunatic Legion. He destroyed one of Captain America's shields.

The character was portrayed by Rune Temte in the Marvel Cinematic Universe film Captain Marvel (2019).

Publication history
The character first appeared in Avengers Vol. 1, #364 (July 1993), and was created by writer Mark Waid and artist Joe Kubert. He was introduced as part of the Lunatic Legion during the Live, Kree or Die story arc.

Fictional character biography
Bron Char was with the second lineup of the Lunatic Legion led by Galen Kor when they attacked the Cape Canaveral base, and he ambushed Captain America and smashed the triangular shield that he was carrying at the time. He battered Captain America initially, but when Captain America saw how many people the Kree had been experimenting on, he became furious and beat Bron Char badly.

Powers and abilities
Bron-Char has considerable strength for a Kree.

In other media
Rune Temte appears as Bron-Char in the 2019 live-action Marvel Cinematic Universe film Captain Marvel. This version is an expert in hand-to-hand combat and is a member of Starforce alongside Yon-Rogg, Carol Danvers (then known as "Vers"), Att-Lass, Minn-Erva, and Korath. While on a mission to the planet Torfa to rescue a Kree scout, Starforce is ambushed by a group of Skrulls, who capture Vers. After she escapes and crash-lands on Earth, Starforce head there to rescue her. However, as Vers had discovered the truth of the Kree's war with the Skrulls and her true identity, she fights her former team and subdues Bron-Char.

References

External links

 

Characters created by Mark Waid
Comics characters introduced in 1993
Kree
Marvel Comics aliens
Marvel Comics extraterrestrial supervillains
Marvel Comics male supervillains